Cezary Jędrzycki (born 23 January 1969) is a Polish rower. He competed in the men's quadruple sculls event at the 1992 Summer Olympics.

References

1969 births
Living people
Polish male rowers
Olympic rowers of Poland
Rowers at the 1992 Summer Olympics
Rowers from Warsaw